Abdul Ghafoor Majeed Noorani, known popularly as A. G. Noorani (born 16 September 1930), is a lawyer in India and political commentator. He has practised as an advocate in the Supreme Court of India and in the Bombay High Court.

Early life and education
Noorani was born in Bombay (now Mumbai) in 1930. He attended a Jesuit school, St. Mary's, and got his law degree from Government Law College, Mumbai.

Career
His columns have appeared in various publications, including Hindustan Times, The Hindu, Dawn, The Statesman, Frontline, Economic and Political Weekly and Dainik Bhaskar. 
He is the author of a number of books including: The Kashmir Question, Badruddin Tyabji Ministers' Misconduct, Brezhnev's Plan for Asian Security, The Presidential System, The Trial of Bhagat Singh, Constitutional Questions in India and The RSS and the BJP: A Division of Labour (LeftWord Books, 2000). He has also authored the biographies of Badruddin Tyabji and Dr Zakir Hussain.

He has defended Sheikh Abdullah of Kashmir during his long period of detention. He appeared in the Bombay High Court for former Tamil Nadu Chief Minister Karunanidhi against the latter's main political rival J. Jayalalitha.

Publications 

 The Destruction of Hyderabad (2014), 
 The Kashmir Dispute 1947–2012, 2 Volume set (editor, 2013), 
 Islam, South Asia and the Cold War (2012)
 Article 370: A Constitutional History of Jammu and Kashmir (2011)
 Jinnah and Tilak: Comrades in the Freedom Struggle (2010)
 India–China Boundary Problem 1846–1947: History and Diplomacy (2010), 
The RSS and the BJP:A Division of Labour(2008), 
 Indian Political Trials 1775–1947 (2006), 
 Constitutional Questions and Citizens' Rights (2006)
 The Trial of Bhagat Singh: Politics of Justice (2005), 
 The Muslims of India: A Documentary Record (editor, 2003)
 Islam and Jihad: Prejudice versus Reality (2002) 
 The Babri Masjid Question 1528–2003: 'A Matter of National Honour''', in two volumes (2003).
 Constitutional Questions in India: The President, Parliament and the States (2002), 
 Savarkar and Hindutva (2002), 
 Challenges to Civil Rights Guarantees in India, (2012) ISBN 9780199088577 

Reception
The Kashmir Dispute 1947–2012
In a scholarly review of The Kashmir Dispute 1947–2012'', Tooba Khurshid from the Institute of Strategic Studies Islamabad it was noted that Khurshid points out that the book is a collection of documents, both archival and contemporary, as well as speeches and interviews and notes that Noorani has supported his arguments with reference to a large array of documents to provide the historical context of the political dispute. Khurshid highly recommends the book for researchers and also praises it for its reference to a large number of archived documents. Khurshid classifies the book as "solid, scholarly research" and recommends it also to policy makers because of its considerable use of classified documents.

References

1930 births
Living people
20th-century Indian lawyers
21st-century Indian Muslims
Indian political writers
Scholars from Mumbai
University of Mumbai alumni
Indian columnists
Islam and secularism
Indian people of Pashtun descent
21st-century Indian historians
20th-century Indian historians
Writers about the Kashmir conflict